Ambassadors Group, Inc. is a defunct publicly traded educational travel company based in Spokane, Washington. It was originally an operating division of Ambassadors International, Inc., but was divested into a separate corporation in 2002 to form the company under its current name. The CEO is Jeffrey Thomas, whose 2009 compensation totaled over $1.7 million.

This for-profit company has a close business relationship with People to People Student Ambassador Program and several other related cultural exchange groups involving students from several countries.

According to the company's end of year filings, in 2008 and 2009, Ambassadors Group served 41,929 and 34,248 travelers, respectively. In 2010, the company estimated that it would serve 26,674 participants (a net decrease of 22%.)

History 
 In 1956, President Dwight D. Eisenhower founded People to People.
 In 1967, Ambassadors Group is founded
 In 1995, Ambassadors Group became a wholly owned subsidiary of Ambassadors International, Inc.  Jeffrey Thomas joined the company.
 In 1996, acquisition of Marc L. Bright (professionals).  Jeffrey Thomas becomes President.
 In 1999, acquisition of Travel Dynamics (sport)
 In 2001, Jeffrey Thomas became CEO
 On February 28, 2002, Ambassadors Group spun off from Ambassadors International
 In March 2007, Ambassadors International  bought Windstar from Carnival for $100 million.
 On May 15, 2008, Ambassadors Group bought BookRags, an educational website for $18 million. The merger was a friendly takeover.
 On March 17, 2009, Ambassadors Group announced its partnership with Discovery Education to become the travel provider for the new Discovery Student Adventures learning and adventure-based trips for students in grades 5–12. In 2010 approximately 125 students traveled.
 On April 30, 2013, Jeffey Thomas resigns from Ambassadors Group.
 On July 13, 2015 the company announced its imminent dissolution. Ambassadors Group cites losses of over $17.5 Million in 2014 and floundering sales as causes for closing up shop at the end of this year.  A bankruptcy court in Delaware held a two-day auction and Anschutz Corporation won Windstar Cruises with a bid of $39 million.
 On October 8, 2015, it was announced that beginning in 2016, Enriching Cultural Experiences (ECE) International will serve as the travel provider of People to People International replacing the Ambassadors Group.

Travelers (thousands) :

BookRags
BookRags is an educational website that provides summaries, study guides, and lesson plans on literary works. Based in Chicago, Illinois, United States, the website is a subsidiary of Gradesaver LLC. BookRags was founded in 1999 by James Yagmin and David Lieberman, who had recently graduated from college. On May 15, 2008, BookRags was bought by Ambassadors Group for $18 million. The merger was a friendly takeover.

BookRags contains concise book summaries and thorough analysis of more than 6,000 literary works, which is, according to one source, the largest collection online. It also has a list of characters and their descriptions, as well as an important quotes section. The website has over 10,000 e-Books in its collection and 8,400 biographies in its database. It facilitates students purchasing duplicates of fellow students' papers.

In a 2010 interview with The New York Times, Carl Fisher, the department chair of the comparative world literature and classics at California State University, Long Beach, criticized BookRags for being "simplistic" and "forc[ing] people to pay up front".

References

External links
 Official website

Companies based in Spokane, Washington
Transport companies established in 1967
Education in Spokane, Washington
Companies formerly listed on the Nasdaq
1967 establishments in Washington (state)